The Central District of Galugah County is a district (bakhsh) in Galugah County, Mazandaran Province, Iran. At the 2006 census, its population was 26,694, in 7,026 families.  The District has one city: Galugah. The District has two rural districts (dehestan): Azadegan Rural District and Tuskacheshmeh Rural District.

References 

Galugah County
Districts of Mazandaran Province